Haraldur Kálvsson (or Harald Kalvsson), was, in the year 1412, lawman of the Faroe Islands.

References
G. V. C. Young: Færøerne – fra vikingetiden til reformationen. København 1982. s. 88

Lawmen of the Faroe Islands
15th-century Norwegian people
Year of death unknown
Year of birth unknown